In the mathematical theory of Riemannian geometry, there are two uses of the term Fermi coordinates.
In one use they are local coordinates that are adapted to a geodesic. In a second, more general one, they are local coordinates that are adapted to any world line, even not geodesical.

Take a future-directed timelike curve , 
 being the proper time along  in the spacetime . 

Transport the basis along  making use of Fermi-Walker's transport. 
The basis  at each point  is still orthonormal with  

This property is not valid for Fermi's coordinates however when  is not a geodesic.
Such coordinates are called Fermi coordinates and are named after the Italian physicist Enrico Fermi. The above properties are only valid on the geodesic. The Fermi-Coordinates adapted to a null geodesic is provided by Mattias Blau, Denis Frank, and Sebastian Weiss. Notice that, if all Christoffel symbols vanish near , then the manifold is flat near .

See also
Proper reference frame (flat spacetime)#Proper coordinates or Fermi coordinates
 Geodesic normal coordinates
 Fermi-Walker transport
 Christoffel symbols
 Isothermal coordinates

References 

Riemannian geometry
Coordinate systems in differential geometry